Many terms are used in mechanical ventilation, some are specific to brand, model, trademark and mode of mechanical ventilation.  There is a standardized nomenclature of mechanical ventilation that is specific about nomenclature related to modes, but not settings and variables.

Terms are now split into acronyms of CONTROL VARIABLE + BREATH SEQUENCE + TARGETING SCHEME.  As in PC-CMV, Pressure Controlled Continuous Mandatory Ventilation. The term trigger (commonly flow or pressure) denotes the criteria that starts inspiration and cycle denotes the criteria that stops it. 
The target variable should not be confused with the cycle variable or the control variable. The target variable only sets an upper limit for pressure, volume or flow.

Control variable

The physical parameter that controls the breath in accordance with the equation of motion

Equation of motion
Pressure = Elastance*Volume + Resistance*Flow

Volume control (VC)
Volume controlled ventilation is ventilation where both volume and flow are controlled by the ventilator. Normally, flow is set to a fixed amount, meaning volume increases linearly over time.

Any mode that relies on flow to control inspiration falls under the VC- category.

Pressure control (PC)
Pressure controlled ventilation is where pressure as a function of time is controlled by the ventilator. Normally, pressure is set to a specific amount for a specific breath duration, letting volume and flow vary according to patient demands.

Any mode that relies on pressure to deliver a breath falls under the PC- category.

Time control (TC)

Rarely breaths can be purely time controlled. An example is intrapulmonary percussive ventilation. Here only time is set by the operator and pressure and flow change obeying the equation of motion.

Breath Sequence

Continuous mandatory ventilation (CMV)

Commonly known as “Assist/Control”; CMV is a breath sequence for which spontaneous breaths are not possible between mandatory breaths because every patient trigger signal in the trigger window produces a machine cycled inspiration (i.e., a mandatory breath). Machine triggered mandatory breaths may be delivered at a preset rate. Therefore, in contrast to IMV, the mandatory breath frequency may be higher than the set frequency but never below it. In some pressure controlled modes on ventilators with an active exhalation valve, spontaneous breaths may occur during mandatory breaths, but the defining characteristic of CMV is that spontaneous breaths are not permitted between mandatory breaths.

Terms replaced by VC-CMV
 Assist/Control
 A/C
 ACV
 CMV
 Volume Assist/Control
 Volume Control
 Volume Limited Ventilation
 Volume Controlled Ventilation
 Controlled Ventilation
 Volume Targeted Ventilation

Terms replaced by PC-CMV
 Assist/Control
 A/C
 ACV
 CMV
 Pressure Assist/Control
 Pressure Control
 Pressure Limited Ventilation
 Pressure Controlled Ventilation
 Pressure Targeted Ventilation

Intermittent mandatory ventilation (IMV)
IMV is a form of ventilation where the ventilator delivers mandatory breaths, but spontaneous breaths are possible between mandatory breaths. Mandatory breaths can be delivered at a set frequency (with spontaneous breaths occurring in between), or can be delivered whenever breath volume per minute falls below a set point.

Terms replaced by VC-IMV
 Synchronized Intermittent Mandatory Ventilation
 SIMV
Terms replaced by PC-IMV
 Synchronized Intermittent Mandatory Ventilation
 SIMV

Continuous spontaneous ventilation
Continuous Spontaneous Ventilation — CSV is a breath sequence for which all breaths are spontaneous.
Terms no longer in use:
 Spont
 Spontaneous

Targeting schemes
 Set point - e.g. - PC-CSVs is the tag for Pressure support.
 Adaptive - e.g. - PC-IMVa,a is the tag for VC+.
 Optimal - e.g. - PC-IMVoi, oi is the tag for Adaptive Support Ventilation (ASV), technically due only to minor safety algorithms, if not it would only be "optimal" but not "intelligent".
 Dual - e.g. - VC-CMVd is the tag for CMV + pressure limited ventilation.
 Biovariable - PC-CSVb is the tag for Variable Pressure Support. 
 Servo - e.g. - PC-CSVr is the tag for NAVA.
 Intelligent - e.g. - PC-IMVoi, oi is the tag for Adaptive Support Ventilation (ASV) and for INTELLiVent-ASV.

Mandatory breath
Mandatory Breath is a breath type during mechanical ventilation for which inspiration is machine triggered and/or machine cycled.

Terms no longer in use
 Machine breath
 mechanical breath

Spontaneous breath
Spontaneous Breaths are a breath type for which inspiration is both patient triggered and patient cycled. Applies to assisted or unassisted breathing.

Assisted ventilation or breath
Assisted ventilation or assisted breath references ventilation (or breath) for which a machine provides some or all of the work of breathing.

Terms no longer in use
 Patient triggered ventilation
 Patient triggered breath

Patient triggered breath
Patient triggered breath — A breath that is initiated by the patient, independent of ventilator settings for frequency.

Terms no longer in use
 Patient assisted breath
 assisted breath

Autotriggering
Autotriggering — Autotriggering is the unintended initiation of breath delivery by the ventilator, e.g., by an external disturbance such as movement of the breathing tube or an inappropriate trigger sensitivity setting.
Terms no longer in use
 Autocycling

Non-standardized terminology
The following are terms that are included in modes of mechanical ventilation but are not yet included in the standardized nomenclature.

Volume related
 Vt — Tidal volume
 Ve — Minute ventilation
 Amplitude — High-frequency ventilation (Active)

Pressure related
 Pip — Peak inspiratory pressure
 Pplat — Plateau pressure (airway)
 Mpaw — Mean airway pressure
 EPAP — Pressure applied to exhalation
 IPAP — Pressure applied to inhalation
 Phigh — Highest pressure attained, similar to Pip; this is a constant pressure.
 Plow — Pressure that Phigh drops to during expiratory time (Tlow)
 PEEP — Positive end-expiratory pressure, pressure created by a backpressure valve.
 CPAP — Continuous positive airway pressure
 Δp — Delta-P, the change in pressure from the highest pressure to the lowest pressure.
 PS- Pressure Support

Time related
 I:E — Inspiratory:Expiratory ratio
 Thigh — Time set for inhalation.
 Tlow — Time set for exhalation.
iT - Inspiratory Time

References

Respiratory therapy
Mechanical ventilation
Pulmonology